The 1972 Big League World Series took place from August 14–19 in Fort Lauderdale, Florida. Orlando, Florida defeated Inglewood, California in the championship game.

Teams

Results

References

Big League World Series
Big League World Series